Queen Louise of Sweden may refer to:

 Louisa Ulrika of Prussia (1720-1782), daughter of Frederick William I of Prussia and Sophia Dorothea of Hanover; wife of Adolf Frederick, King of Sweden
 Louise of the Netherlands (1828–1871), daughter of Prince Frederick of the Netherlands and Princess Louise of Prussia (1808–1870); wife of Charles XV of Sweden
 Louise of Battenberg (1889–1965), daughter of Prince Louis of Battenberg and Princess Victoria of Hesse and by Rhine; wife of Gustaf VI Adolf of Sweden